Vincent-Louis Stenzel (born 13 October 1996) is a German footballer who plays for Rot-Weiß Oberhausen. He plays as a right winger.

Club career
Stenzel joined Borussia Dortmund in January 2014 from Mainz 05 and played for the club's reserves in the 3. Liga. He made his professional debut in the 3. Liga on 13 February 2015 against Mainz 05 II.

In August 2018, free agent Stenzel joined 3. Liga side Carl Zeiss Jena on an initial half-year contract. In December, the club announced his contract would not be renewed.

On 18 January 2019, Stenzel joined Bonner SC.

References

External links
 
 

1996 births
Living people
Association football forwards
German footballers
Borussia Dortmund II players
SC Freiburg II players
Hallescher FC players
FC Carl Zeiss Jena players
Bonner SC players
Rot-Weiß Oberhausen players
3. Liga players
Germany youth international footballers
People from Lünen
Sportspeople from Arnsberg (region)
Footballers from North Rhine-Westphalia